Malokarpatan is a black metal and heavy metal band from Bratislava, Slovakia, formed in 2014. They have released three full-length albums.

Style and themes 

The band style has been described as a mixture between traditional speed metal, progressive rock and the first black metal wave.

Malokarpatan founder As (Adam Sičák), has referred as his greatest influences "the classic 80s metal songwriting and catchiness, the black metal madness and mystery, and the folk psychedelia coming from our local culture"

Members 

 HV (Vladimír Moravčík) - vocals
 As (Adam Sičák) - guitars
 Aldaron (Juraj Štefanec) - guitars
 Peter (Peter Széntpeteri) - bass
 Miroslav (Miroslav Švacho) - drums

Discography

Studio albums
 Stridžie Dni (2015)
 Nordkarpatenland (2017)
 Krupinské Ohne (2020)

External links

 Official page on Facebook
 Malokarpatan at Bandcamp
Malokarpatan discography at MusicBrainz

Malokarpatan discography at Discogs

References 

Slovak heavy metal musical groups
2014 establishments in Slovakia
Black metal musical groups
Musical groups established in 2014